Warhurst is a surname. Notable people with the surname include:

 John Warhurst (athlete)
 John Warhurst (academic)
 John Warhurst (sound editor)
Kit Warhurst (born 1971), Australian musician, older brother of Myf Warhurst
Myf Warhurst (born 1973), Australian radio announcer and television personality, younger sister of Kit Warhurst
Paul Warhurst (born 1969), English footballer
Roy Warhurst (1926–2014), English footballer